The Valentine Phantom, often referred to as the Valentine Bandit in media reports, refers to an unidentified individual or group who each Valentine's Day secretly decorate the downtown area of a city in the United States with a series of red hearts printed on sheets of letter-sized paper.

The reports began in Portland, Maine in 1985, and the perpetrators remain unknown. Speculation about the individual or group which decorates before dawn each February 14 is popular in conversation, and local media, and over the past ten years has emerged as an example of vernacular culture.

History
The earliest known occurrence was 1976 in Portland, Maine, and every year since, red hearts have appeared throughout the city on Valentine's Day morning.
  
Beginning in the early 2000s, red hearts drawn on white sheets of paper have been attached to the doors of businesses along the Pearl Street business district in Boulder, Colorado each Valentine's Day, according to reports in the Daily Camera newspaper. In Boulder, the mysterious Valentine's messenger has been dubbed the "kissing bandit."  

In 2002, the city of Montpelier, Vermont became a part of the yearly tradition, with the added twist of each heart including a poem signed "The Valentine Phantom".

On Valentine's Day 2010, pink hearts appeared up and down St. Johnsbury, Vermont's Railroad & Main Street, even finding their way to the local police and fire department buildings.

On Valentine's Day 2012, this phenomenon spread to Bangor, Maine when Bangorians woke up to a flurry of red and white hearts throughout downtown Bangor and the tradition continues into 2013 with the addition of cute messages and candy.

On Valentine's Day 2017, the bandit allowed a Bangor Daily News reporter to accompany them on their travels, in return for anonymity. The bandit, after tagging a Planned Parenthood office in Portland, stated that they are normally apolitical but felt "we could be a bit more progressive this year". A Planned Parenthood spokesperson stated that a liaison for the bandit contacted them the prior week to request permission to post a heart banner.

Vermont history

Montpelier's incarnation of the phenomenon began in 2002 near the corner of Main Street and State Street. The windows of shops were covered in 8.5" x 11" color copies of red hearts. They appeared before dawn, and for the most part were welcome and not seen as a nuisance. In subsequent years the center remained the intersection of Main and State streets, but grew outward to include Langdon Street, Elm Street, and lower State Street near the State House and the Pavilion. This raised speculation that the Valentine Phantom might be a team. 

In 2006, for the first time, the "bandit" applied banners with large red hearts around the base of the columns on the portico of the Vermont State House. They were photographed, reproduced on web blogs and on the website of the Friends of the Vermont State House. These same banners were again displayed on the statehouse in 2007.  On Valentine's Day 2008, they appeared on the chimney stack of Montpelier High School and on the tower of College Hall at the Vermont College of Fine Arts.  In 2009, they were hung over the entrance of the Kellogg-Hubbard Library and from the landslide cliff on Elm Street. In 2010, two heart banners were hung from the Langdon Street Bridge.

On Valentine's Day 2007, the phenomenon became larger, and coincided with a dumping of heavy snow. The Times Argus reported, "Despite the snow, however, the Valentine bandit visited the Statehouse and other buildings in Montpelier on Wednesday to put up large red paper hearts. Other state buildings, stores and restaurants were also visited during the night, with business windows throughout downtown Montpelier covered in the red paper hearts – a mystery that has become a Valentine’s Day tradition in the state’s capital city." For the first time, sculptural hearts painted red were planted on the public lawn in front of the State House. A blizzard brought a fresh coat of snow setting off the bright red heart sculptures. The Vermont State House Sergeant at Arms, Francis Brooks, allowed the valentine banners and sculptures to remain through the day.

During the winter of 2008, the slate roof on the steeple of the Methodist church on Main Street in Montpelier was replaced by Southgate Steeple Jacks.  The new slate roof features several red hearts around the base of the steeple.  Jay Southgate designed the new roof for the church and was quoted in the Montpelier Bridge saying that the use of the hearts was inspired by Montpelier's Valentine Phantom.   Coincidentally, February 14, 2008 was the first sunny, calm day in several weeks, allowing the Southgate crew to resume their work on the roof — that's the day they began to place the red slate of the hearts on the steeple.

On September 1, 2009, rainbow hearts mimicking the Valentine Bandit appeared around Montpelier to celebrate the legalization of same-sex marriage in Vermont. 

On the morning of February 14, 2015, the residents of Montpelier awoke to find that the tradition had been broken; no hearts appeared throughout the city.  In response, a group of students from the local high school hung hearts that afternoon, and the Valentine Phantom has struck again each year since.

See also
 List of practical joke topics
 Poe Toaster

References
 Michael Sletcher. New England.  Westport, CT, 2004.

External links
 The Montpelier Valentine Phantom Phan Page
 Photograph of the Valentine Bandit's 2006 work on the website of the Friends of the Vermont State House
 Latitude 44.2 North entry on Montpelier's Valentine Bandit
 The Valentine bandit's handiwork on the website of Sarah Adelman
 2012: Mysterious Valentines blanket downtown Bangor
 Bangor Valentine Phantom page
 2013: Bangor Phantom Valentine Strikes Again

Montpelier, Vermont
Washington County, Vermont
Vermont culture
Practical jokes
Unofficial observances
Winter traditions
Traditions
Bangor, Maine
Culture of Portland, Maine